The Lachian Dances (in Czech: Lašské tance) was the first mature work by the Czech composer Leoš Janáček. It was named after region of Lachia in the east of Czechia.

Background 
Janáček began to compose the first set of instrumental arrangements of folk dances in 1888. The first performance took place on 11 January 1889 in Olomouc. The composition was reworked again in 1925, when Janáček made a new selection and ordering of numbers, including some changes in instrumentation. The work was printed in 1928, shortly before Janáček's death, by Hudební matice in Prague.

Structure 
The work is split into six separate dances:

Arrangements
 Arrangement suitable for: orchestra
 arrangement for: wind orchestra
 arrangement by: Karel Bělohoubek
 performed by: Czech Army Central Band, co Karel Bělohoubek
 Arrangement suitable for: orchestra 
 arrangement by: Hynek Sluka
 performed by: Prague Castle Guard and Police Wind Orchestra, co Rudolf Rydval
 Arrangement suitable for: orchestra
 arrangement by: Karel Bělohoubek,  Jaroslav Šíp, Viliam Béreš
 performed by: Czech Army Central Band, co Vladimír Válek

See also 
 Lach dialects

References

External links 
 
Janáček Lachian Dances with choreography (YouTube)

Compositions by Leoš Janáček
1888 compositions
1925 compositions